The White-Slave Traffic Act, also called the Mann Act, is a United States federal law, passed June 25, 1910 (ch. 395, ; codified as amended at ). It is named after Congressman James Robert Mann of Illinois.

In its original form the act made it a felony to engage in interstate or foreign commerce transport of "any woman or girl for the purpose of prostitution or debauchery, or for any other immoral purpose". Its primary stated intent was to address prostitution, immorality, and human trafficking, particularly where trafficking was for the purposes of prostitution. It was one of several acts of protective legislation aimed at moral reform during the Progressive Era. In practice, its ambiguous language about "immorality" resulted in it being used to criminalize even consensual sexual behavior between adults. It was amended by Congress in 1978 and again in 1986 to limit its application to transport for the purpose of prostitution or other illegal sexual acts.

The Mann Act was inspired by a widespread "white slavery hysteria"--a fear that young white women were being forced into prostitution at alarming rates. Ultimately it originated  from cultural changes that occurred as a result of industrialization, immigration, urbanization, and increasing numbers of women workers. The myth scapegoated immigrants and sexually active women and fed Americans' fears about female independence, women's waged work, and female sexuality. This fear became a cultural narrative of moral panic, sensationally depicted in newspapers and films. The Mann Act was passed in 1910 as a way to legislate morality by criminalizing transportation of women across state lines for immoral purposes, but it was vaguely worded and created a witch-hunting atmosphere that targeted not only traffickers but also voluntary prostitutes, men, women having affairs, and anyone who aided in providing transportation to someone for some perceived moral purpose. The Mann Act was also used to close down all areas of suspected vice because of threats of white slavery.

Promotion
In the 19th century, many of America's cities had designated legally protected areas of prostitution. Increased urbanization, as well as greater numbers of young women entering the workforce, led to greater flexibility in courtship without supervision. It was in this changing social sphere that concern over "white slavery" began.  This term referred to women kidnapped for the purposes of prostitution and derives from Charles Sumner's 1847 description of the Barbary slave trade.

Numerous communities appointed vice commissions to investigate the extent of local prostitution, whether prostitutes participated in it willingly or were forced into it, and the degree to which it was organized by any cartel-type organizations. The second significant action at the local level was to close the brothels and the red light districts. From 1910 to 1913, city after city changed previously tolerant approaches and forced the closing of their brothels. Opposition to openly practiced prostitution had been growing steadily throughout the last decades of the 19th century. The federal government's response was the Mann Act.  The purpose of the act was to make it a crime to "transport or cause to be transported, or aid to assist in obtaining transportation for" or to "persuade, induce, entice or coerce" a woman to travel.  Many of the changes that occurred after 1900 were a result of tensions between social ideals and practical realities. Family form and functions changed in response to a complex set of circumstances that were the effects of economic class and ethnicity.

According to historian Mark Thomas Connelly, "a group of books and pamphlets appeared announcing a startling claim: a pervasive and depraved conspiracy was at large in the land, brutally trapping and seducing American girls into lives of enforced prostitution, or 'white slavery.' These white slave narratives, or white-slave tracts, began to circulate around 1909." Such narratives often portrayed innocent girls "victimized by a huge, secret and powerful conspiracy controlled by foreigners", as they were drugged or imprisoned and forced into prostitution.

This excerpt from The War on the White Slave Trade was written by the United States District Attorney in Chicago:

According to Connelly, such concerns represented an "hysterical" version of genuine and long-standing issues arising from the concentration of young women from rural backgrounds in the expanding cities of the era, many of whom were drawn into prostitution for "mundane" economic reasons. A number of Vice Commission reports had drawn attention to the issue. Some contemporaries questioned the idea of abduction and foreign control of prostitution through cartels. For example, noted radical and feminist Emma Goldman asked "What is really the cause of the trade in women? Not merely white women, but yellow and black women as well. Exploitation, of course; the merciless Moloch of capitalism that fattens on underpaid labor, thus driving thousands of women and girls into prostitution. With Mrs. Warren these girls feel, 'Why waste your life working for a few shillings a week in a scullery, eighteen hours a day?' ... Whether our reformers admit it or not, the economic and social inferiority of woman is responsible for prostitution." While prostitution was widespread, contemporary studies by local vice commissions indicate that it was "overwhelmingly locally organized without any large business structure, and willingly engaged in by the prostitutes."

Suffrage activists, especially Harriet Burton Laidlaw and Rose Livingston, took up the concerns. They worked in New York City's Chinatown and in other cities to rescue young white and Chinese girls from forced prostitution, and helped pass the Mann Act to make interstate sex trafficking a federal crime. Livingston publicly discussed her past as a prostitute and made the claim that she was abducted and developed a drug problem as a sex slave in a Chinese man's home, narrowly escaped, and experienced a Christian conversion. Although her claim was unsupported by evidence, her story exemplified the stereotypes used to pass the Mann Act—fear of foreigners, especially Chinese men; abduction and drugging in order to be raped and enslaved; a narrow escape; and salvation through Christian conversion. Other groups like the Woman's Christian Temperance Union and Hull House focused on children of prostitutes and poverty in community life while trying to pass protective legislation.  The American Purity Alliance also supported the Mann Act.

Legal application

Although the law was created to stop forced sexual slavery of women, the most common use of the Mann Act was to prosecute men for having sex with underage females. The phrase "immoral purpose" in the statute allowed a broad application of the law following its affirmation in 

In addition to its stated purpose of preventing human trafficking, the law was used to prosecute unlawful premarital, extramarital, and interracial relationships. The penalties would be applied to men whether or not the woman involved consented and, if she had consented, the woman could be considered an accessory to the offense. Some attribute enactment of the law to the case of world champion heavyweight boxer Jack Johnson. Johnson was known to be intimate with white women, some of whom he met at the fighting venue after his fights. In 1912 he was prosecuted, and later convicted, for "transporting women across state lines for immoral purposes" as a result of his relationship with a white prostitute named Belle Schreiber; the month prior to the prosecution, Johnson had been charged with violating the Mann Act due to traveling with his white girlfriend, Lucille Cameron, who refused to cooperate with the prosecution and whom he married soon thereafter.

The 1948 prosecution of Frank LaSalle for abducting Florence Sally Horner is believed to have been an inspiration for Vladimir Nabokov in writing his novel Lolita. Humbert Humbert, the narrator, at one point explicitly refers to LaSalle. The Mann Act has also been used by the U.S. federal government to prosecute polygamists (such as Mormon fundamentalists) because the U.S. has no federal law against polygamy. All U.S. states have anti-polygamy laws, but only in recent years have state authorities used them to prosecute bigamy. Colorado City, Arizona; Hildale, Utah; Bountiful, British Columbia; and sites in Mexico are historic locations of several Mormon sects that practiced polygamy, although The Church of Jesus Christ of Latter-day Saints has expressly forbidden polygamy since the start of the 20th century. Sect leaders and individuals have been charged under the Mann Act when "wives" are transported across the Utah–Arizona state line or the U.S.–Canadian and U.S.–Mexican borders.

Notable prosecutions under the Mann Act

Notable individuals prosecuted under the Act

 Anwar al-Awlaki, an American Islamist cleric, was investigated for violations of Mann Act, authorities primarily wanting to arrest him for his ties to the 9/11 hijackers, but left the United States for Yemen before he could be detained.
 Dušan Popov, a World War II Allied double agent with a "James Bond" lifestyle, was threatened with arrest under the Mann Act.<ref name="CG">{{cite book
|url=https://books.google.com/books?id=Tu86exHKPvMC&q=du%C5%A1ko+popov+mann+act&pg=RA3-PA272
|author=Gentry, Curt
|year=2001
|page=272
|title=J. Edgar Hoover: The Man and the Secrets|publisher=W. W. Norton & Company
|isbn=978-0-393-32128-9}}</ref>
 Individuals associated with the Emperors Club VIP prostitution ring that had Eliot Spitzer as a client while he was governor of New York.
 Individuals associated with the Fundamentalist Church of Jesus Christ of Latter-Day Saints (FLDS), such as Warren Jeffs and Merril Jessop have refused to answer questions during depositions and court hearings, citing the 5th amendment, over concerns of self-incrimination related to "potential state investigation still ongoing, as well as criminal investigations under the Mann Act out of the U.S. Attorney's Office."

Mann Act case decisions by the United States Supreme Court
 Hoke v. United States, . The Court held that Congress could not regulate prostitution per se, as that was strictly the province of the states. Congress could, however, regulate interstate travel for purposes of prostitution or "immoral purposes".
 Athanasaw v. United States, . The Court decided that the law was not limited strictly to prostitution, but to "debauchery" as well.
 Caminetti v. United States, . The Court decided that the Mann Act applied not strictly to purposes of prostitution, but to other noncommercial consensual sexual liaisons. Thus consensual extramarital sex falls within the genre of "immoral sex".
   The Court ruled that consent by the victim to their own transportation does not constitute conspiracy or culpability under the Act.
 Cleveland v. United States, . The Court decided that a person can be prosecuted under the Mann Act even when married to the woman if the marriage is polygamous. Thus polygamous marriage was determined to be an "immoral purpose".
 Bell v. United States, . The Court decided that simultaneous transportation of two women across state lines constituted only one violation of the Mann Act, not two violations.
  The Court affirmed that a victim can be compelled to testify against a spouse who violated the Act, in exception to the common law spousal privilege rule.
  The Court ruled that it is not impossible for a victim of the Act to be charged with conspiracy under specific circumstances. The requirements for conspiracy by a victim of the Act were limited in a later ruling, 

Congressional amendments to the law
In 1978, Congress updated the act's definition of "transportation" and added protections against commercial sexual exploitation for minors. It added a 1986 amendment which further protected minors and added protection for adult males. In particular, as part of a larger 1986 bill focused on criminalizing various aspects of child pornography that passed unanimously in both houses of Congress, the Mann Act was further amended to replace the ambiguous "debauchery" and "any other immoral purpose" with the more specific "any sexual activity for which any person can be charged with a criminal offense" as well as to make it gender-neutral.

Effects and alterations of the Mann Act
While the Mann Act was meant to combat forced prostitution, it had repercussions that extended into consensual sexual activity. Because it lacked specificity, it criminalized many who were not participating in prostitution. It became a way to persecute large numbers of unmarried couples participating in premarital or extramarital activities, especially when it involved crossing state lines such as in the cases for Chuck Berry and Jack Johnson. The Mann Act also became a form of blackmail, by wives who were suspicious of cheating husbands or other women. This was the case for both Drew Caminetti and Maury Diggs. Both men from Sacramento, California, were married, and took their mistresses (Lola Norris and Marsha Warrington, respectively) to Reno, Nevada. The men's wives contacted the police, and the men were arrested in Reno and found guilty under the Mann Act. One author wrote:

In 1914 a woman by the name of Jessie A. Cope was arrested in Chicago for attempting to bribe an official to assist her in the blackmail of Colonel Charles Alexander of Providence Rhode Island, on a white slavery charge. The two had met two years previous in LA, Alexander had promised to divorce his wife, and marry her. When he attempted to leave her, Cope and her mother pursued him to Providence. Cope consulted lawyers in Providence and LA, then brought the charges in Chicago, where she was arrested.

Upon continuous blackmail accounts, The New York Times became an advocate against the Mann Act. In 1915 the paper published an editorial pointing out how the act led to extortion. In 1916 it labeled the Mann Act "The Blackmail Act", arguing that its dangers had been clear from the start as the act could make a harmless spree or simple elopement a crime. The paper also called the "blackmail that resulted from the Mann Act [...] worse than the prostitution it sought to suppress".

While the Mann Act has never been repealed, it has been amended and altered since its initial passing. The Mann Act continued essentially unchanged until 1978 amendments that expanded coverage to issues around child pornography and exploitation. Most recently, in 1986, the Mann Act was significantly altered to make the whole Act gender neutral and to redress the specific ambiguous phrasing that had enabled decades of unjust applications of the Act. With the 1986 amendments, the Mann Act outlaws interstate or foreign transport of "any person" for purposes of "any sexual activity for which any person can be charged with a criminal offense." Prior to the Supreme Court ruling in Lawrence v. Texas (2003), sodomy was illegal in many states which left open the possibility of prosecution under the Mann Act of consenting adult couples, especially gay couples, though there is no record of such enforcement actions.

See also
 Caminetti v. United States Chamberlain–Kahn Act
 International Agreement for the suppression of the White Slave Traffic
 International Convention for the Suppression of the Traffic in Women and Children
 Sex trafficking in the United States
 The Traffic in Women
 Traffic in Souls (1913)
 Travel Act
 Lolita''

References

Further reading
 
 
 Donovan, Brian. White Slave Crusades: Race, Gender, and Anti-vice Activism, 1887-1917. United States: University of Illinois Press, 2010. .

External links
 

 
Progressive Era in the United States
1910 in American law
61st United States Congress
Prostitution law in the United States